Tyrone Caldwell (born March 23, 1947) is a former American football player and coach. He was selected by the San Diego Chargers in the 1970 NFL Draft. Caldwell was the final head football coach at University of Maryland Eastern Shore, serving for one season, in 1979, and compiling a record of 3–7–1.

Head coaching record

References

1947 births
Living people
American football defensive ends
American football defensive tackles
Alabama A&M Bulldogs football coaches
Continental Football League players
Maryland Eastern Shore Hawks football coaches
Miles Golden Bears football coaches
South Carolina State Bulldogs football players
Sportspeople from Memphis, Tennessee
Coaches of American football from Tennessee
Players of American football from Memphis, Tennessee